This is a list of houses of the Grand-Place/Grote Markt in Brussels, Belgium, divided by sides of the square.

Between the / and the / (north-west)

Between the / and the / (south-east)

Between the / and the / (south-east)

Between the / and the / (north-east)

Between the / and the / (north-west)

References

Notes

Bibliography

Further reading
 
 

Brussels-related lists
City of Brussels
Protected heritage sites in Brussels
World Heritage Sites in Belgium
Tourist attractions in Brussels
Baroque architecture in Belgium
Art by Peter Van Dievoet